= Bodybuilding in Malaysia =

- Country: Malaysia
- National team(s): Malaysia

Bodybuilding in Malaysia has featured one builder winning the Mr. Universe competition nine times. Malaysian Bodybuilding Federation is the sport's governing body in the country.

== History ==
Sazali Abd Samad won Mr. Universe competition nine times. In 2014, he decided to move from the 70kg category to the 75kg category. He has also won the Mr. Asia eight times. Malaysia sent a bodybuilding team to the Southeast Asia Games in Myanmar.

== Governance ==
The sport is governed by the Malaysian Bodybuilding Federation (PBBM), which is a recognized by the International Federation of Bodybuilding and Fitness as the national federation, representing the country's bodybuilding community. PBBM is a member of the Asian Bodybuilding and Physique Sports Federation.
